Samachvalavičy is a village in Republic of Belarus, located in the Minsk District of Minsk Region. First documental record: 18th century.

External links

 Photos at Globus.tut.by 

Villages in Belarus
Populated places in Minsk Region
Minsk District
Minsky Uyezd

External links
 Samachvalavičy official website